Hydriomena arida is a species of moth in the family Geometridae. This species is endemic to New Zealand. It has been hypothesised that species belongs to another genus and so this species is also currently known as Hydriomena (s.l.) arida.

References

Sterrhinae
Moths described in 1879
Moths of New Zealand
Endemic fauna of New Zealand
Taxa named by Arthur Gardiner Butler
Endemic moths of New Zealand